Indonesians in the United Arab Emirates are Indonesian citizens who live and work in the United Arab Emirates. They are mostly concentrated in the Abu Dhabi and Dubai. As of 2012, their estimated population was 100,000.

See also
Expatriates in the United Arab Emirates

References

United Arab Emirates
Asian diaspora in the United Arab Emirates
Emirati people of Indonesian descent